Glyphodes shafferorum is a moth of the family Crambidae described by Pierre Viette in 1987. It is found on the Comoros, Réunion, Madagascar and in Mauritius and South Africa. Their wingspan is about 20–30 mm.

The larvae feed on Ficus species, including F. carica, F. reflexa, F. rubra and F. benghalensis.

References

Moths described in 1987
Glyphodes
Moths of Madagascar
Moths of the Comoros
Moths of Mauritius
Moths of Réunion
Moths of Africa
Lepidoptera of South Africa